Dmitry Vladimirovich Shishin (born 14 March 1986) is a Russian beach soccer player currently active as forward, playing for the Russia national beach soccer team and BSC Kristall. Shishin is Merited Master of Sports of Russia.

Career
Dmitry's father Vladimir brought him to football at age seven, his first coach being Alexey Tarasov. He began his career in Sokol Saratov, then he played futsal until 2006, when he discovered beach soccer. In 2007, members of the Russian Football Union discovered the talented Shishin at the tournament "Golden Sands of Samara", and invited him to the Russia national beach soccer team. That year Shishin participated at the Russian Championship as player of Samarian Sputnik and debuted for the national team at the Beach Soccer World Cup.

After Sputnik, Shishin for a long time played for different Saratov clubs, such as Rosagro, Biznes-Pravo, Delta. In 2011, Shishin moved to Lokomotiv Moscow, where he won the championship trophy with his team. Together with the Lokomotives he won another national championship trophy and two Russian cups. In 2013, Shishin switched to Rotor Volgograd, who became runners-up of the 2013 Championships, losing there to Kristall, as well as winners of the 2014 Championships and the 2014 Russian Cup. In the two years Shishin scored 66 goals in 43 caps.

Shishin is one of the top players for the national team. He is the top scorer for the Russian national team. He was numerous times MVP player and best forward player. At the 2013 FIFA Beach Soccer World Cup, he scored the fifth and last goal against Spain, and with 11 goals became best goalscorer.

On 21 December 2012, Shishin was named Merited Master of Sports by the order of the Sports Minister.

Achievements

National team
FIFA Beach Soccer World Cup champion: 2011, 2013, 2021
Euro Beach Soccer Cup champion: 2010, 2012
Euro Beach Soccer League champion: 2009, 2011, 2017

Clubs
Russian National champion: 2008, 2009, 2010, 2011, 2012, 2014, 2015, 2016, 2018, 2019, 2021
Russian Cup champion: 2008, 2009, 2011, 2012, 2013, 2014, 2015
Russian Super Cup: 2011, 2018

Individually
2011 season
Euro Beach Soccer League, Stage 2 – MVP
Euro Beach Soccer League, Stage 2 – Top Scorer
2012 season
Euro Beach Soccer League, Stage 2 – MVP
Euro Beach Soccer League, Stage 2 – Top Scorer
Merited Master of Sports (21 December 2012)
2018 season
Euro Beach Soccer League, Stage 3 – Best Player

References

External links
Profile on Beach Soccer Russia
Profile on BSC Kristall 

Russian beach soccer players
1986 births
Living people
Sportspeople from Saratov
European Games gold medalists for Russia
Beach soccer players at the 2015 European Games
European Games medalists in beach soccer
Beach soccer players at the 2019 European Games